Lauren "Elle" Duncan (born April 12, 1983) is an American sports anchor for ESPN.

Career

Atlanta 
Duncan began her career in Atlanta as an intern with the 2 Live Stews, an American syndicated sports talk radio show on 790/The Zone.  After a year, she was hired by Atlanta host, Ryan Cameron, to join the Ryan Cameron Show on V-103.  While there, her roles included traffic reporter and on-air personality.  Duncan hosted an afternoon show at the station in 2009 before moving to handle sports reporting for the morning Frank and Wanda show.  During her time with V-103, Duncan also was a contributor with the Atlanta Falcons radio network pre- and post-game shows, the Atlanta Hawks sideline reporter, and a freelance sideline reporter for SEC and ACC football games on Comcast Sports South. Duncan landed a job as the traffic reporter at NBC affiliate WXIA-TV in 2012.

Boston 
Duncan joined NESN in 2014 as an anchor, reporter, and host. Duncan began co-hosting NESN Live Presented by Cross Insurance with Sarah Davis.  The show features updates from NESN reporters and game-day analysis from Fenway Park, TD Garden, and Gillette Stadium. While at NESN, Duncan has also worked as a sideline reporter for the Boston Red Sox and hosted coverage of Super Bowl XLIX between the New England Patriots and Seattle Seahawks from Glendale, Arizona.

ESPN 
Duncan joined SportsCenter as an anchor on April 27, 2016. She hosts the weekday 6pm ET edition of SportsCenter with Kevin Negandhi.

Duncan is known as a rabid University of Georgia fan.  She talks about this often on air.

FCL 
Duncan joined the hosts of American talk show FishCenter Live.

Film 
Duncan appeared in the 2014 movie Ride Along as a news reporter.

DUI arrest 
While working as an 11Alive traffic reporter and Atlanta Hawks sideline reporter, Duncan was arrested for DUI and reckless driving on April 28, 2013. According to the written report by the arresting officer, Duncan was observed "weaving in and out of traffic in a reckless manner" at a "high rate of speed," and "narrowly" missed striking another vehicle. Her breathalyzer test showed a blood alcohol content of 0.099, above the legal limit of 0.08.

Philanthropic efforts 
Duncan has been involved with Walker, a non-profit leader in special education, behavioral health and residential treatment for children and youth.  Specifically, Duncan has been involved with Walker’s Change Shoes, Change Lives Run and Walk and engaged with Walker’s youth through on-campus volunteering and events through NESN’s employee volunteer program, NESN Connects.

While at V-103, Duncan launched a Cause & Effect series to recognize a number of local nonprofit organizations quarterly. The series consisted of different events throughout Atlanta that raised funds for underexposed nonprofit organizations. Duncan has also worked as a spokeswoman with Enchanted Closet, an organization which provides prom dresses, shoes, and accessories to disadvantaged girls for prom.

Girl Dad 
On January 27, 2020, the evening after the Kobe Bryant helicopter crash, Elle Duncan hosted ESPN's flagship program SportsCenter and gave an emotional, heartwarming account of a conversation she had with Bryant two years earlier at an ESPN event in New York City, where Bryant told her: "I'm a girl dad". It started a national trend for the hashtag "Girl Dad" featuring pictures and accounts of daughters and their dads.

Accolades 
Top 25 Women in Atlanta – The Steed Society
2011 Inspiring Women Award – Atlanta Dream     
Atlanta's Top 30 under 30 – AUC Magazine
50 Most Beautiful Atlantans – Jezebel Magazine
Power 40 Under 40 It List – Johnson Media

References

External links 
 Elle Duncan on Twitter
 

African-American television hosts
American television journalists
African-American television personalities
American television sports anchors
Disney people
ESPN people
Living people
People from Atlanta
African-American women journalists
American sports journalists
1983 births
American women television journalists
African-American sports journalists
21st-century American journalists
21st-century American women
American women sportswriters
University of West Georgia alumni